Jai Chabria is an American political strategist who has served as a strategist and advisor for politicians such as United States senator J.D. Vance and former Governor of Ohio John Kasich. He currently serves as the Managing Director of MAD Global Strategy.

Career 
Chabria began his political career as a political assistant for John Kasich’s congressional reelection campaign in 1996. Chabria was retained as a political assistant for Kasich’s 2000 presidential campaign. He also worked on special projects for Kasich’s New Century Project political action committee. He later worked with Kasich when he left Congress and they both worked for the financial firm Lehman Brothers.

Chabria was eventually appointed as the Senior Advisor to the Governor after Kasich was elected Governor of Ohio in 2010. Chabria was also a member of the Kasich administration’s Ohio Human Trafficking Task Force. He also oversaw the transition of Ohio’s Department of Development as it became the private economic development corporation JobsOhio.

Chabria eventually left his role as Kasich’s Senior Advisor to oversee planning for the 2016 Republican National Convention in Cleveland. In 2022, Chabria served as a chief strategist for J.D. Vance’s senatorial campaign.

In addition to his work in politics, Chabria also worked jobs in investment banking for companies such as Lehman Brothers and Barclays Capital. He also co-founded the nonprofit organization Our Ohio Renewal with J.D. Vance. Prior to his current job as Managing Director of the public affairs firm MAD Global Strategy, he also served as Managing Director of Mercury, another public strategy firm.

Chabria has served as an analyst for television news outlets such as Fox News, Fox Business, and the Canadian Broadcasting Corporation.

References 

Living people
American political consultants
American campaign managers
Ohio Wesleyan University alumni
Ohio Republicans
People from Powell, Ohio
American politicians of Indian descent
Asian conservatism in the United States